
Gmina Biecz is an urban-rural gmina (administrative district) in Gorlice County, Lesser Poland Voivodeship, in southern Poland.

Villages
Apart from the town of Biecz, Gmina Biecz contains the villages and settlements of Babiniec, Binarowa, Bugaj, Bukowina, Czyżówka, Dolna Niwa, Dział, Firlitówka, Fiszty, Fortepian, Głęboka, Górna Niwa, Grudna Kępska, Janikówka, Kamieniec, Kąty, Kolonia Libusza, Korczyna, Lechowe Potoki, Libusza, Łukowice, Maśluchowice, Nagórze, Padoły, Pasternik, Piekło, Pisarzówka, Podskale, Pola, Półrole, Racławice, Równia, Równie, Rożnowice, Rzeki, Serwoniec, Sitnica, Stawiska, Strzeszyn, Szczegominy, Ukraina, Wielki Potok, Wilczak, Wygon, Wyręby, Zagórze, Zaropie and Zielona Ulica.

Neighbouring gminas
Gmina Biecz is bordered by the gminas of Gorlice, Lipinki, Moszczenica, Rzepiennik Strzyżewski, Skołyszyn and Szerzyny.

References
Polish official population figures 2006

Biecz
Gorlice County